Did It for Love is the sixth studio album by American singer-songwriter Leela James. It was released by Shesangz Music under exclusive license to BMG Rights Management on March 31, 2017. The album peaked at number 30 on the US Billboard Top R&B/Hip-Hop Albums chart and number 72 on the Billboard 200. The album's lead single, "Don't Want You Back", was released on October 21, 2016, and reached number one on the Billboard Adult R&B Songs chart.

Critical reception

Allmusic editor Andy Kellman found that Did It for Love producers James and Rex Rideout, "joined by several additional associates, are well-matched, evidently capable of covering a lot of emotional range and tying it all together. Dismissal, wistfulness, and contentment are among the many romantic conditions they soundtrack here, and they manage to do it with a perspective that is steeped in soul tradition but fresh for 2017 [...] Fans of James' earlier output might balk at perceived impurities, like snaking/rattling trap-style drums that undergird some of the tracks, but they're secondary, utilized with finesse, like a natural evolution of what the likes of Kashif and Jimmy Jam and Terry Lewis did with machines during the early '80s."

Track listing
Credits adapted from the liner notes of Did It for Love.

Charts

References

2017 albums
Leela James albums